Iulius Cezar Zamfir (born 27 October 1966) is a Romanian former footballer who played as a midfielder.

Playing career
Cezar Zamfir was born on 27 October 1966 in Bucharest and started playing football in 1986 at Progresul București, after which he went to play for Inter Sibiu. In 1989, Zamfir went to play for Dinamo București, where in his first season spent at the club, he won the title, the cup and reached the 1989–90 European Cup Winners' Cup semi-finals, also managing to score the third goal of a 3–0 league victory against rival Steaua București. From 1991 until 1998, Zamfir played for Rapid București, reaching two cup finals, winning one. He ended his playing career at Gloria Bistrița. Zamfir has a total of 23 matches played in European competitions.

Managerial career
Cezar Zamfir started his managerial career in 1999, working as an assistant at Sportul Studențesc București until 2010, a period in which he also was the team's head coach on several occasions. Afterwards he worked as Tibor Selymes's assistant at Astra Ploiești and FCM Târgu Mureș, after they previously worked together at Sportul Studențesc and he also worked as an assistant for Valentin Sinescu, Daniel Isăilă and Florin Marin at Astra Giurgiu. From 2017 he started to work as László Balint's assistant coach at ASA Târgu Mureș, Miercurea Ciuc, Sportul Snagov, Metaloglobus București and UTA Arad.

Honours
Dinamo București
Divizia A: 1989–90
Cupa României: 1989–90
Rapid București
Cupa României: 1997–98, runner-up 1994–95

References

1966 births
Living people
Romanian footballers
Association football midfielders
Liga I players
FC Progresul București players
FC Inter Sibiu players
FC Dinamo București players
FC Rapid București players
ACF Gloria Bistrița players
Romanian football managers
FC Sportul Studențesc București managers
Footballers from Bucharest